Manhattan Tango is a live album by multi-instrumentalist Joe McPhee and flautist Jérôme Bourdellon recorded in New York in 2000 and first released on the French Label Usine.

Reception

Allmusic reviewer Eugene Chadbourne states "For McPhee and Bourdellon's combination of instruments, however, the sound of the room is simply fantastic, creating a richness that would simply not be possible using any kind of reverb-recording equipment available, analog, digital or magical". On All About Jazz John Kelman states "Manhattan Tango is clearly not for the less adventurous listener. Still, with an almost telepathic connection that results in some startling coalescence of sound, rhythm and texture, it makes a strong case that free music can be more than just a cacophony of sound, that it can be the meeting point for daring and an investigation into interaction that, in some respects, is all the more compelling for its lack of traditional framework" while Rex Butters said "Manhattan Tango captures the intimacy of two friends playing in two friends' living room, materializing fire".

Track listing 
All compositions by Joe McPhee and Jérôme Bourdellon
 "Business Hour" - 4:49
 "Pearls for Swine" - 6:40
 "White Street, 17A" - 5:24 		
 "A.K.A.L.H." - 9:25
 "In the Noiseless Loft" - 4:14
 "Come Back Ella" - 3:26
 "Mystery "J"" - 8:56
 "Manhattan Tango" - 10:52

Personnel 
Joe McPhee - pocket trumpet, voice
Jérôme Bourdellon - flute, bass flute, piccolo flute

References 

 
Joe McPhee live albums
2004 live albums